Jack Albie Patterson (March 16, 1890 – November 18, 1971) was a North Dakota Republican Party politician who served as the 19th Lieutenant Governor of North Dakota from 1939 to 1941 serving under Governor John Moses. Patterson also served in the North Dakota House from 1933 to 1934. Patterson was originally from Illinois and came to Minot, North Dakota as a railroad telegrapher after serving overseas in World War I. He later retired to Arizona, where he died in 1971.

Notes

Lieutenant Governors of North Dakota
1890 births
1971 deaths
Republican Party members of the North Dakota House of Representatives
Mayors of Minot, North Dakota
20th-century American politicians